Ma Qinghua (born 25 December 1987) is a Chinese racing driver currently competing in the World Touring Car Cup with Cyan Performance Lynk & Co.

Ma became the first Chinese driver to win an FIA World Championship race when he won race two of the 2014 FIA WTCC Race of Russia. He has also previously competed in the World Touring Car Championship, GP2, a few practice sessions in Formula 1, and Formula E.

Early life
Ma was born on 25 December 1987 in Shanghai. His father, Ma Qiangyun, was the owner of a car repair shop. Ma began karting at the age of 8 and his family decided to focus all financial investments towards Ma's testing on more advanced racing tracks. Eventually, in order to make Ma's progress easier, the family invested in a karting track located in Quyang. Ma won the national karting junior championship at the age of 12.

Career
Ma started his professional racing career in the 2005 Asian Formula Renault challenge with Asia Racing Team for 6 races coming 16th with the highest finish of 5th. He also competed in one race in the 2005 Italian Formula 3000 championship for team Astromega and raced in the 2006 Formula Renault 2.0 NEC championship for the same team. He also raced in the inaugural A1 Grand Prix season for Team China at the A1 Grand Prix of Nations, China at the Shanghai International Circuit, coming 17th.  For the next few years he raced in European Formula 3 championships like the 2008 Spanish Formula 3 Championship and 2009 British Formula 3 championship. He then competed in the 2010 Superleague Formula in the 2010 Ordos Superleague Formula round for Team China and a year later won the China Touring Car Championship's 1600c class driver's title.

Formula One

2012
Ma was added to the HRT F1 driver development programme on 5 April 2012, and made history as the first China-born driver to drive a Formula One car at an FIA-sanctioned event, a milestone described as "heralding an important step for Chinese motorsport". Ma also became the first driver of Chinese nationality to take part in a Grand Prix weekend when he replaced Narain Karthikeyan in the first Friday practice session of the Italian Grand Prix. He was given three more chances to drive the car in Friday sessions later that year.

2013 
Ma had a contract to become a full time HRT driver in 2013, meaning he would become the first ever Chinese Formula 1 driver, however after HRT collapsed at the end of the 2012 season, this would never be and Ma instead moved to Caterham, continuing the role of Friday test driver whilst racing for their GP2 Series team for the season. In 2013 Chinese Grand Prix, he replaced Charles Pic to participate in FP1 and became the first Chinese driver to drive at his home Grand Prix session, but he was about 1.5 seconds off the pace to his teammate Giedo van der Garde and out of the 107% reference time to the quickest driver in Free Practice 1. Soon after the 2013 Chinese Grand Prix, Caterham team claimed that he would be replaced by Alexander Rossi for the rest of the 2013 season. In the 2013 Bahrain GP2 Series round, Alexander Rossi made his debut GP2 Series race and took a podium finish.

GP2 
He made his debut GP2 Series race in 2013 Sepang GP2 Series round. Later in the final stint, his lap time dropped to more than 2 minutes in every lap and finished only 21st in featured race, which is the last place in classified drivers. Later he was diagnosed with gastroenteritis leading to extreme dehydration by the medical team on track at Sepang and would not start the sprint race.

World Touring Car Championship 
Ma raced in the 2014 World Touring Car Championship for Citroën Total WTCC driving at selected rounds in the fourth car. He won the second round of the Race of Russia, becoming the first Chinese driver to win an FIA World Championship race, and scored the fastest lap at the first round of the Race of China, Shanghai, ultimately coming 13th in the championship. He was given a full time seat for 2015 and won the second round of the Race of Portugal and finish 4th in the drivers championship. Despite this, he was not retained for 2016.

Formula E 
In 2016, Ma replaced Salvador Duran in the 2015-16 Formula E season for Team Aguri. He retired from his first ePrix but finished the last 3 races, albeit out of the points. In the next season, Ma was signed by TeCheetah but was replaced by former Haas F1 driver Esteban Gutiérrez following a disappointing series of performances in the first three races of the season.

Ma returned to Formula E in 2017 with the Nio Formula E Team for the Paris ePrix replacing Luca Filippi in a one off appearance and again in the New York ePrix replacing Oliver Turvey who was injured.  He returned in 2019 to race for the Nio 333 FE Team alongside Turvey. He was replaced by Daniel Abt for the Berlin rounds as travel restrictions disallowed him from traveling outside China. He was not renewed for the 2020-21 Formula E World Championship by NIO 333.

TCR China 
Ma competed in the 2020 TCR China series in a Geely Group Motorsport-built Lynk & Co 03 TCR. He has signed for Shell Teamwork Lynk & Co Motorsport and will partner Lu Wei in the six-event series. On 21 November 2020, at the Guia Race of Macau, Ma finished second in the qualifying race of the 2020 TCR China Touring Car Championship season finale, securing the drivers’ title.

FIA WTCR
On 22 February 2022, it was announced that Ma Qinghua has joined reigning world champions Lynk & Co Cyan Racing to race a Lynk & Co 03 TCR in the 2022 FIA World Touring Car Cup.

Racing record

Career summary

† As Ma was a guest driver, he was ineligible for points.
‡ Team point score.
* Season still in progress.

Complete Formula One participations
(key) (Races in bold indicate pole position) (Races in italics indicates fastest lap)

Complete GP2 Series results
(key) (Races in bold indicate pole position) (Races in italics indicate fastest lap)

Complete World Touring Car Championship results
(key) (Races in bold indicate pole position) (Races in italics indicate fastest lap)

† Driver did not finish the race, but was classified as he completed over 90% of the race distance.

Complete Formula E results
(key) (Races in bold indicate pole position; races in italics indicate fastest lap)

Complete TCR China Touring Car Championship results
(key) (Races in bold indicate pole position) (Races in italics indicate fastest lap)

Complete World Touring Car Cup results
(key) (Races in bold indicate pole position) (Races in italics indicate fastest lap)

† Driver did not finish the race, but was classified as he completed over 90% of the race distance.

Complete FIA World Rallycross Championship results

Supercar

References

External links

 
 
 
 Ma Qinghua's Sina Weibo
 Ma Qinghua's QQ microblog

1987 births
Living people
Sportspeople from Shanghai
Chinese racing drivers
A1 Team China drivers
British Formula Three Championship drivers
Euroformula Open Championship drivers
Formula Renault 2.0 NEC drivers
Auto GP drivers
GP2 Series drivers
World Touring Car Championship drivers
World Rallycross Championship drivers
Formula E drivers
World Touring Car Cup drivers
Asian Formula Renault Challenge drivers
TCR Asia Series drivers
NIO 333 FE Team drivers
Techeetah drivers
Team Aguri drivers
Citroën Racing drivers
Caterham Racing drivers
Team West-Tec drivers
Team Astromega drivers
Superleague Formula drivers
Asia Racing Team drivers
A1 Grand Prix drivers
Sébastien Loeb Racing drivers
Boutsen Ginion Racing drivers